Benjamin Attahir (born 25 February 1989 in Toulouse) is a French composer, violinist and conductor.

He studied the violin under Ami Flammer.

Attahir made three short plays for marionettes by Maurice Maeterlinck, La Mort de Tintagiles, Intérieur and Alladine et Palomides, into an opera entitled Le Silence des ombres, premiered at La Monnaie in Brussels in September 2019.

On 21 February 2020, BBC Radio 3 broadcast a concert including his Al Asr string quartet (2017), performed by the Arod Quartet, recorded at Perth Concert Hall, Scotland in 2018.

Attahir has also put to music W. B. Yeats's poem 'The song of wandering Aengus'.

References

Living people
1989 births
21st-century French composers
21st-century French male violinists
French conductors (music)
Musicians from Toulouse